Aliceville Lake is a reservoir in western Alabama and eastern Mississippi, on the Tennessee-Tombigbee Waterway. Close to Aliceville, it is impounded by the Tom Bevill Lock and Dam.

See also
List of Alabama dams and reservoirs

References

External links

Protected areas of Lowndes County, Mississippi
Protected areas of Noxubee County, Mississippi
Bodies of water of Pickens County, Alabama
Tennessee–Tombigbee Waterway
Reservoirs in Alabama
Reservoirs in Mississippi
Protected areas of Pickens County, Alabama
Bodies of water of Lowndes County, Mississippi
Bodies of water of Noxubee County, Mississippi